George Turner (1818 – 19 May 1891) was an English missionary, active in Samoa and elsewhere in the South Pacific.

He was the author of Nineteen Years in Polynesia: Missionary Life, Travels, and Researches in the Islands of the Pacific, 1861; and of Samoa A Hundred Years Ago and Long Before, 1884.

References
 Hiney, Tom. 2000. On the Missionary Trail: a journey through Polynesia, Asia and Africa with the London Missionary Society.
 Turner, George. Nineteen Years in Polynesia: Missionary Life, Travels, and Researches in the Islands of the Pacific. https://books.google.com/books?id=D7Ltq-fdtBMC&printsec=frontcover&source=gbs_ge_summary_r&cad=0#v=onepage&q&f=false

English Congregationalist missionaries
Congregationalist missionaries in Samoa
British expatriates in Samoa
1818 births
1891 deaths